Silver cyanide is the chemical compound with the formula AgCN. It is a white solid that precipitated upon treatment of solutions containing Ag+ with cyanide, which is used in some schemes to recover silver from solution. Silver cyanide is used in silver-plating.

Structure
The structure of silver cyanide consists of -[Ag-CN]- chains in which the linear two-coordinate Ag+ ions are bridged by the cyanide ions, typical of silver(I) and other d10 ions. This is the same binding mode as seen in the more famous case of Prussian blue. These chains then pack hexagonally with adjacent chains offset by +/- 1/3 of the c lattice parameter. This is the same as the structure adopted by the high temperature polymorph of copper(I) cyanide. The silver to carbon and silver to nitrogen bond lengths in AgCN are both ~2.06 Å and the cyanide groups show head-to-tail disorder.

Reactions
AgCN precipitates upon the addition of sodium cyanide to a solution containing Ag+.  On the addition of further cyanide, the precipitate dissolves to form linear [Ag(CN)2]−(aq) and [Ag(CN)3]2−(aq). Silver cyanide is also soluble in solutions containing other ligands such as ammonia or tertiary phosphines.

Silver cyanides form structurally complex materials upon reaction with other anions.  Some silver cyanides are luminescent.

Uses
"Cyanidation" is widely used in the isolation of silver from its ores.  Partial purification of silver compounds is usually effected by froth flotation.  The silver ion is then separated from the skimmed froth with cyanide, yielding a solution of [Ag(CN)2]−.  The silver metal can then be plated out by electrolysis of such solutions.

Both AgCN and KAg(CN)2 have been used in silver-plating solutions since at least 1840 when the Elkington brothers patented their recipe for a silver-plating solution. A typical, traditional silver-plating solution would contain 15-40 g·L−1 KAg(CN)2 , 12-120 g·L−1 KCN and 15 g·L−1 K2CO3.

See also
 List of compounds with carbon number 1

References

Cyanides
Silver compounds